Kenneth Alfonzo Ladler Jr. (born June 23, 1992) is a former gridiron football safety. He played college football at Vanderbilt, and was signed as an undrafted free agent by the Buffalo Bills in 2014. He also played for the Edmonton Eskimos and BC Lions of the Canadian Football League, and the Washington Redskins and New York Giants of the National Football League.

High school
Ladler attended Stephenson High School in Stone Mountain, Georgia. As a senior, he helped Stephenson to an undefeated regular season and to the second round of the state playoffs. He registered 80 tackles, four interceptions and a forced fumble. He also scored on punt return, INT return and a blocked punt.

Considered a three-star recruit by Rivals.com, he was rated the 42nd best safety prospect in the nation. He committed to Vanderbilt over offers from East Carolina, Kentucky, Louisville, New Mexico, South Carolina, and Toledo.

College career
As a true freshman in 2010, he appeared in every game at free safety, including nine starts for the Commodores. He finished fifth on team in total tackles with 57, while also registering 5.5 tackles for loss, a forced fumble and one interception, and was a selection on the All-SEC Freshman team. In 2010, he played in all 13 games, earning five starts. He finished the season fourth on the team with 53 tackles, while adding four pass deflections and one interception. In 2012, he started all 13 games, while leading the team with 90 tackles, three pass deflections, two interceptions and a forced fumble. In 2013, he earned second-team All-SEC honors after he recorded a team leading 91 tackles, with nine pass deflections and five interceptions. He also led the SEC and shared the NCAA lead while setting a team record with five forced fumbles.

Professional career

Buffalo Bills
Ladler was signed by the Buffalo Bills as an undrafted free agent. He was among final cuts by the Bills on August 30, 2014, but was signed to the practice squad the next day. On October he was promoted to the active roster and after suffering an arm injury he was placed on season ending injured reserve on October 28, 2014. He was released by the team on September 1, 2015.

Edmonton Eskimos
Ladler was signed by the Edmonton Eskimos prior to 2016 season. In Kenny's first season in 2016, he had 70 tackles and 2 interceptions. The following season saw a major improvement for Ladler where he recorded 86 tackles and 3 interceptions, he was then named the Eskimos defensive player of the year and later named to the CFL all defense team.

Washington Redskins
On January 9, 2018, Ladler signed a reserve/future contract with the Washington Redskins. On September 1, 2018, he was waived for final roster cuts before the start of the season, but signed with their practice squad the following day. He was promoted to the active roster on September 11, 2018. He was waived on November 6, 2018.

New York Giants
On November 14, 2018, Ladler was signed to the New York Giants practice squad. He was promoted to the active roster on December 6, 2018.

Ladler was waived/injured during final roster cuts on August 31, 2019, and reverted to the team's injured reserve list the next day. He was waived from injured reserve with an injury settlement on September 5.

Washington Redskins (second stint)

Ladler signed with the Redskins on December 27, 2019, but was released on February 14, 2020.

BC Lions
Ladler signed with the BC Lions on February 25, 2020. After the CFL canceled the 2020 season due to the COVID-19 pandemic, Ladler chose to opt-out of his contract with the Lions on August 31, 2020. He opted back in to his contract on January 19, 2021. He retired from football on June 23, 2021.

References

External links
Vanderbilt Commodores bio

1992 births
Living people
American players of Canadian football
Players of American football from Georgia (U.S. state)
People from Stone Mountain, Georgia
Sportspeople from DeKalb County, Georgia
Vanderbilt Commodores football players
Canadian football linebackers
American football safeties
Buffalo Bills players
Edmonton Elks players
Washington Redskins players
New York Giants players
BC Lions players